Beachill is an English surname. Notable people with the surname include:

 Arthur Beachill (1905–1943), English footballer
 Lee Beachill (born 1977), English squash player

English-language surnames